Berthold John Haas (February 8, 1914 – June 23, 1999), was a professional baseball player who played first base in the Major Leagues from 1933 to 1951. He played for the Cincinnati Reds, New York Giants, Brooklyn Dodgers, Chicago White Sox, and Philadelphia Phillies. In 1947, Haas was selected as a National League all-star.

In 721 games over nine seasons, Haas posted a .264 batting average (644-for-2440) with 263 runs, 22 home runs, 263 RBI, 51 stolen bases and 204 bases on balls.

At the end of his career he managed in the minor leagues from 1955–1958 and 1962 and in the Mexican League in 1961.

References

External links

1914 births
1999 deaths
Major League Baseball first basemen
Baseball players from Illinois
Brooklyn Dodgers players
Cincinnati Reds players
Philadelphia Phillies players
New York Giants (NL) players
Chicago White Sox players
National League All-Stars
Sportspeople from Naperville, Illinois
Minor league baseball managers
Beatrice Blues players
Clinton Owls players
Milwaukee Brewers (minor league) players
Nashville Vols players
Montreal Royals players
Columbus Red Birds players
Minneapolis Millers (baseball) players
Oakland Oaks (baseball) players
St. Paul Saints (AA) players
Albany Senators players
High Point-Thomasville Hi-Toms players
Wenatchee Chiefs players
Sportspeople from the Chicago metropolitan area